The Yangyang Pumped Storage Power Station uses the water of the Namdae-Chun River to operate a  pumped storage hydroelectric power scheme, about  west of Yangyang in Gangwon Province, South Korea. Construction on the power plant began in 1996 and it was completed and dedicated on September 13, 2006. It is operated by Korean Midland Power Co., a subsidiary of Korea Electric Power Company and was completed at a cost of ₩1.1 trillion won (US$1.4 billion). The first generator was operational on February 23, 2006 and the last August 10, 2006.

Design and operation

When electricity demand rises and the power plant begins to operate, water is released from the upper reservoir back towards the underground power plant, at the western edge of the lower reservoir. The power plant contains four 250 MW reversible Francis turbine-generators for an installed capacity of 1,000 MW.

Additionally, there are 2 x  Wind turbines installed at the upper reservoir and a 1.5 MW small hydro turbine on the Yangsang Dam.

See also

List of power stations in South Korea

References

Dams completed in 2006
Energy infrastructure completed in 2006
Hydroelectric power stations in South Korea
Pumped-storage hydroelectric power stations in South Korea
Yangyang County
Dams in South Korea
Underground power stations